Absolute liability is a standard of legal liability found in tort and criminal law of various legal jurisdictions.

To be convicted of an ordinary crime, in certain jurisdictions, a person must not only have committed a criminal action but also have had a deliberate intention or guilty mind (mens rea). In a crime of strict or absolute liability, a person could be guilty even if there was no intention to commit a crime. The difference between strict and absolute liability is whether the defence of a “mistake of fact” is available: in a crime of absolute liability, a mistake of fact is not a defence. Strict or absolute liability can also arise from inherently dangerous activities or defective products that are likely to result in a harm to another, regardless of protection taken, such as owning a pet rattle snake; negligence is not required to be proven.

Australia
The Australian Criminal Code Act 1995  defines absolute liability in Division 6, subsection 2:

Absolute liability does not allow a mistake of fact defence to be used, as opposed to strict liability.

Regulatory bodies tend to favour the approach of declaring offences to be strict or absolute liability, because it makes it easier to prosecute people: there is no longer a requirement to demonstrate that the defendant was deliberately intending to commit an offence. Jurists consider such a mechanism to be a blunt instrument, and recommend its use only in limited circumstances:

Canada
In Canada, absolute liability is one of three types of criminal or regulatory offences. In R v City of Sault Ste-Marie, the Supreme Court of Canada defined an absolute liability offence as an offence "where it is not open to the accused to exculpate himself by showing that he was free of fault". This can be compared to a strict liability offence (where an accused can raise the defence of due diligence) and mens rea offences (where the prosecutor has to prove that the accused had some positive state of mind).

Generally, criminal offences are presumed to be mens rea offences, and regulatory offences are presumed to be strict liability offences. Therefore, most offences are not absolute liability offences, and usually will require an explicit statement in the statute. To determine if an offence is an absolute liability offence, the courts must look at:

The combination of an absolute liability offence and the possible sentence of jail violates section 7 of the Canadian Charter of Rights and Freedoms and is unconstitutional. Specifically, jail violates a person's liberty and an absolute liability offence is not in accordance with the principles of fundamental justice. (See Re B.C. Motor Vehicle Act.)

India
In Indian tort law, absolute liability is a standard of tort liability that stipulates:

In other words, absolute liability is strict liability without any exception. That liability standard has been laid down by the Indian Supreme Court in M.C. Mehta v. Union of India (Oleum Gas Leak Case). 

The Indian judiciary tried to make a strong effort following the Bhopal disaster in December 1984 (Union Carbide Company v. Union of India) to enforce greater amount of protection to the public. The doctrine of absolute liability was therefore evolved in the Oleum gas leak case and can be said to be a strong legal tool against rogue corporations that were negligent towards health risks for the public.  This legal doctrine was much more powerful than the legal doctrine of strict liability developed in the English tort law case Rylands v Fletcher [1868]. This meant that the defaulter could be held liable for even third party errors when the public was at a realistic risk. This could ensure stricter compliance to standards that were meant to safeguard the public.

References

Law of Canada
Public liability
Law of India